The Wedding of Zein (translit. Urs Al-Zayn) is a 1976 Kuwaiti drama film directed by Khalid Al Siddiq. It is based on the novel of the same name by Sudanese writer Tayeb Salih. The film was selected as the Kuwaiti entry for the Best Foreign Language Film at the 51st Academy Awards, but was not accepted as a nominee.

Cast
 Ali Mahdi as Zein
 Sunni Dafallah
 Ibrahim Hujazi as Haneen
 Mohamed Khairi
 Soraya Roro
 Awad Siddig
 Tahiya Zaroug as Nama

See also
 List of submissions to the 51st Academy Awards for Best Foreign Language Film
 List of Kuwaiti submissions for the Academy Award for Best Foreign Language Film

References

External links
 

1976 films
1976 drama films
Kuwaiti drama films
1970s Arabic-language films
Films based on Sudanese novels